Orita Hiraochi (January 23, 1847 – May 7, 1905) was a Japanese politician who served as governor of Hiroshima Prefecture from April 1896 to April 1897. He was also governor of Yamagata Prefecture (1882–1883), Fukushima Prefecture (1883–1888), Tochigi Prefecture (1889–1894) and Shiga Prefecture (1897–1899).

Governors of Hiroshima
1847 births
1905 deaths
Japanese Home Ministry government officials
Governors of Tochigi Prefecture
Governors of Yamagata Prefecture
Governors of Fukushima Prefecture
Governors of Shiga Prefecture